C110 or C-110 may represent:

 Bombardier CSeries C110, later redesignated CS100, now called Airbus A220-100
 USAAF's C-110 transport, a variant of the Douglas DC-5
 A model of HP 9000 workstation
 A model Seiko Epson Epson Stylus inkjet printer
 Honda Super Cub C110 Sports Cub version
 A model of Nissan Skyline, 1972–1977